PAS 4, was an American geostationary satellite that was launched by an Ariane 4.

Satellite description 
PAS-4 was constructed by Hughes Aircraft Corporation, based on the HS-601 satellite bus. Designed for an operational life of 15 years, the spacecraft was equipped with 20 C-band and 30 Ku-band transponders. Its two solar panels, which had a span of  generated 4.7 kW of power when the spacecraft first entered service, which was expected to drop to around 4.3 kW by the end of the vehicle's operational life.

Launch 
Arianespace launched PAS-4, using an Ariane 4 launch vehicle, flight number V76, in the Ariane 42L H10-3 configuration. The launch took place from ELA-2 at the Centre Spatial Guyanais, at Kourou in French Guiana, on 3 August 1995, at 22:58:00 UTC.

References 

Intelsat satellites
Satellites using the BSS-601 bus
Communications satellites in geostationary orbit
Satellite television
Spacecraft launched in 1995
1995 in spaceflight